Puka Hirka (Quechua puka red, hirka mountain, "red mountain", also spelled Pucajirca) is a mountain in the northern part of the Cordillera Blanca in the Andes of Peru which reaches a height of approximately . It is located in the Ancash Region, Corongo Province, Cusca District.

Sources

Mountains of Peru
Mountains of Ancash Region